Karol Jesús Lucero Venegas (born 17 April 1987), also known by his old stage name, Karol Dance, is a Chilean television presenter, radio host and businessman. He has also dabbled as a singer and actor.

Up until 2019, he was one of the most recognizable characters of the television channel Mega, where he served as a panelist in the magazine Mucho gusto and the radio station Radio Carolina, where he hosted “Comunidad K”. He was also a columnist for the Hoy x Hoy newspaper.

Due to being widely criticized by the protesters of the Chilean social outburst, along with several other controversies, Karol temporarily retired from being a public figure.

Biography 
Karol Lucero was born in Santiago. His parents Nancy Venegas and Fernando Lucero named him after Karol Wojtyla (Pope John Paul II), as he was visiting Chile at the time. Karol has a younger brother, named Felipe.

He studied at the Colegio Fray Camilo Henriquez and graduated from eighth grade at the Colegio Lucila Godoy. For a time, he belonged to the first fire company of San Miguel. In 2003 he took a course in media development. In 2004 he graduated from the Liceo Andrés Bello, giving the final speech of his generation and receiving honors. At 17 he entered the university to study law, but abandoned his studies after studying three years.

Career 
He began to work in the television program SQP in January and February 2008, representing the Pokémon subculture.

In May 2008 he was invited by the production of Yingo of Chilevision to be part of the cast of the youth program and sign a contract with the television station, where he now works as a host, and is also host of the program Sin vergüenza which is broadcast on Saturdays and Sundays in Chilevision.

Since the beginning of 2008 is invited to be a stable program panelist Pegao' a las Sabanas on Radio Carolina and hosted his own show in 2009 and 2010 along with Nicole Gomez in Domingo Poncea2 and from 2011 led the first radio video music of Chile Comunidad K.

Then in March 2010, he starred in Amor Virtual first Chilevision mini-series, he was also a special guest on Teatro en Chilevisión. Later, in September 2010, he starred in Don diablo second Chilevisión mini-series. He also starred in the mini-series Vampiras.

Credits 
Radio
 Pegao' a las Sabanas (2008)
 Domingo Poncea2 (2009–2010) Personality with co-hostess Nicole Gómez and Lia Lippi
 Comunidad K (2011–present) Personality

Television
 SQP (Sálvese quien pueda) (2008) Member
 Yingo (2008–13) Host
 Sin vergüenza (2010–present) Host
 Fiebre de baile 3 (2010) Contestant
 Sin uniforme (2014) Host 
 Mucho Gusto (2015–2020) Panelist

Acting 
 Nikolais, diario de un Pokémon (2007) Karol, Supporting role
 Teatro en Chilevisión (2010) Nicolás, Special guest
 Amor Virtual (2010) Mateo Robles, Lead Role
 Don diablo (2010) Ángel Bonilla Bonilla, Lead Role
 Vampiras (2011) Nicolás Zarricueta, Lead Role
 Graduados (2013) Himself, cameo

Discography 
Singles
 "Necesito de tu amor"
 "Me Fallaste"
 "Héroes de la Noche" (featuring Rodrigo Avilés)
 "De la amistad al amor"
 "Amor Virtual" (featuring Rodrigo Avilés and Gianella Marengo)
 "La roja va al mundial" (featuring Rodrigo Avilés and Camilo Huerta)
 "Reggaeglobo" (featuring Rodrigo Avilés and Mariuxi Dominguez)
 "Chile Campeón" (featuring Felix Soumastre)
 "Lolita" (featuring C4)

References

External links
 
 Official Website
 

1987 births
Chilean television presenters
Chilean male actors
21st-century Chilean male singers
Living people
Chilean television personalities